Trevor John French Foster MBE (3 December 1914 – 2 April 2005) was a Welsh rugby footballer, and coach. He played rugby union for Newport and rugby league for Bradford Northern. Trevor Foster was a Sergeant Physical Training Instructor in the British Army during World War II.

Early years
Trevor Foster was born on 3 December 1914 in Newport, Monmouthshire, but is best known for his association with the Bradford Northern rugby league club having joined them as a player in 1938 for £400 from Newport RFC, his home town's rugby union club.

He made a name for himself playing for Newport Schoolboys and Pill Harriers as a teenager, before joining Newport. He was also chosen to play for invitational team Crawshays.

Bradford Northern career 

During this time he scored 140 tries (an incredible return for a forward) including 24 in the 1947–48 season and 6 in 1 game.(It could have been 7 but the ball was knocked from his hands as he crossed the line.) Trevor was the key forward of an outstanding Bradford Northern side in the post war period which won the Rugby League Challenge Cup in 1947 and 1949 with Trevor scoring in both games.

Great Britain and Wales caps 
Trevor Foster won caps for Wales while at Bradford Northern 1939...1951 16-caps, including 7 as captain, and won caps for Great Britain while at Bradford Northern in 1946 against New Zealand, and in 1948 against Australia (2 matches)

It is certain he would have won more caps had it not been for World War II.

Foster was selected for the 1946 Great Britain Lions tour of Australia, but was injured before being able to play a game.

Championship final appearances
Trevor Foster played right-, i.e. number 12, in Bradford Northern's 6–13 defeat by Wigan in the Championship Final during the 1951–52 season at Leeds Road, Huddersfield on Saturday 10 May 1952.

Challenge Cup Final appearances
Trevor Foster played right-, i.e. number 12, in Bradford Northern's 3–8 defeat by Wigan in the 1947–48 Challenge Cup Final during the 1947–48 season at Wembley Stadium, London on Saturday 1 May 1948.

Other notable matches
Trevor Foster played left- and was captain for Northern Command XIII against a Rugby League XIII at Thrum Hall, Halifax on Saturday 21 March 1942.

Unblemished disciplinary record 

Remarkably for a forward of the time Trevor was never sent from the field of play or even cautioned during his 17 years of top flight rugby.

Retirement and coaching 

After his retirement in 1955 he remained a servant of the Bradford club successively as Coach, Director and Chairman of the Supporters Club and timekeeper for Super League home games.

Club saviour 

It was in 1963 when he secured his place in Bradford and Rugby League history when he was the central figure in a campaign to save his beloved Bradford Northern club who had disbanded due to financial problems. He led efforts to reconstitute the club which was then able to rejoin the league the following season. Without his work it is unlikely that the club would exist today.

Honours 
In the 2001 New Year Honours, Trevor Foster was appointed a Member of the Order of the British Empire (MBE) "for services to the community in Bradford, West Yorkshire." In 2004 he was inducted into Welsh Sports Hall of Fame.

Honoured at Bradford
Trevor Foster, has been included in Bradford's; 'Millennium Masters', 'Bull Masters', and in August 2007 he was named in the 'Team of the Century'. Only six players have been included in all three lists, they are; Karl Fairbank, Trevor Foster, James Lowes, Keith Mumby, Robbie Paul and Ernest Ward.

Honoured by Arriva Yorkshire
Arriva Yorkshire honoured 13 rugby league footballers on Thursday 20 August 2009, at a ceremony at The Jungle, the home of the Castleford Tigers. A fleet of new buses were named after the 'Arriva Yorkshire Rugby League Dream Team'. Members of the public nominated the best ever rugby league footballers to have played in West Yorkshire, supported by local rugby league journalists; James Deighton from BBC Leeds, and Tim Butcher, editor of Rugby League World. The 'Arriva Yorkshire Rugby League Dream Team' is; Trevor Foster MBE, Neil Fox MBE, Albert Goldthorpe, Alan Hardisty, Stan Kielty, Lewis Jones, Roger Millward MBE, Malcolm Reilly, Garry Schofield, Keith Senior, David Topliss, Dave Valentine and Adrian Vowles.

Death
Trevor Foster died peacefully in hospital in Bradford after a short illness.

References

External links 
!Great Britain Statistics at englandrl.co.uk (statistics currently missing due to not having appeared for both Great Britain, and England)*Trevor Foster: The Life of a Rugby League Legend
(archived by web.archive.org) BISA's tribute to Trevor Foster
(archived by web.archive.org) The press release announcing Trevor Foster's death
(archived by web.archive.org) A gallery showing images of Trevor Foster's life
(archived by web.archive.org) The Millennium Masters - Forwards
(archived by web.archive.org) Bull Masters - Trevor Foster
(archived by web.archive.org) Team Of The Century
(archived by web.archive.org) Book of condolence
(archived by web.archive.org) Trevor Foster at wales.rleague.com
Pain of defeat serves Dewsbury well to prevent any repeat performance

1914 births
2005 deaths
Army rugby union players
Army XIII rugby league players
Bradford Bulls coaches
Bradford Bulls players
British Army personnel of World War II
Crawshays RFC players
Footballers who switched code
Great Britain national rugby league team players
Members of the Order of the British Empire
Newport RFC players
Northern Command XIII rugby league team players
Pill Harriers RFC players
Royal Army Physical Training Corps soldiers
Rugby league locks
Rugby league players from Newport, Wales
Rugby league second-rows
Rugby union players from Newport, Wales
Wales national rugby league team captains
Wales national rugby league team players
Welsh rugby league administrators
Welsh rugby league coaches
Welsh rugby league players
Welsh rugby union players
Military personnel from Monmouthshire